Givi Didava (born 21 March 1976) is a Georgian footballer who currently plays as a defender for Spartaki-Tskhinvali Tbilisi. He was capped 21 times for the national team between 1998 and 2003.

Didava was a regular in the Dinamo Tbilisi defence from 1994 to 2000, during which period the club won five league titles. He was transferred to Israeli team Maccabi Tel Aviv FC in 2000, but played only 4 games before falling out with the coach. He promptly returned to Georgia and Torpedo Kutaisi, who took over the league hegemony. On 29 January 2003 he signed a contract with Turkish team Kocaelispor, moving there with teammate Revaz Kemoklidze. However, Kocaelispor was relegated, but while Kemoklidze left the club, Didava chose to see through his contract.

In summer 2006, Didava back to Georgian football.

References

External links
 
 TFF statistics

Footballers from Georgia (country)
Expatriate footballers from Georgia (country)
Georgia (country) international footballers
FC Dinamo Tbilisi players
Maccabi Tel Aviv F.C. players
Kocaelispor footballers
Süper Lig players
Expatriate footballers in Belgium
Expatriate sportspeople from Georgia (country) in Belgium
Expatriate footballers in Israel
Expatriate sportspeople from Georgia (country) in Israel
Expatriate footballers in Turkey
Expatriate sportspeople from Georgia (country) in Turkey
Expatriate footballers in Latvia
Expatriate sportspeople from Georgia (country) in Latvia
Association football defenders
1976 births
Living people
FC Torpedo Kutaisi players
K.R.C. Mechelen players
FC Ameri Tbilisi players
Sportspeople from Kutaisi
Erovnuli Liga players